Militant Left is a Trotskyist political party active in both the Republic of Ireland and Northern Ireland. After a split, in 2019, in the Committee for a Workers' International (1974), the group was founded by former members of the Socialist Party who wished to affiliate to the 'refounded' Committee for a Workers' International (2019). Initially known as CWI Ireland, it renamed itself Militant Left in 2020.

The group has one public representative, Donal O'Cofaigh, on Fermanagh and Omagh District Council. O'Cofaigh had previously been a councillor for Sinn Féin in Fermanagh, but resigned in 2009 to join the Socialist Party. While a member of the Socialist Party from 2009 to 2019, he was also a member of the Labour Party (LPNI) and subsequently the Cross-Community Labour Alternative. He was elected to Fermanagh and Omagh District Council in the 2019 Northern Ireland local elections as a Socialist Party member running under the Cross-Community Labour Alternative name, but left to join CWI Ireland later that year.

As of February 2021, Militant Left was not included on the register of political parties in Northern Ireland or the Republic of Ireland.

References

External links

2019 establishments in Ireland
All-Ireland political parties
Anti-austerity political parties in the United Kingdom
Anti-capitalist political parties
Communist parties in Ireland
Eurosceptic parties in Ireland
Far-left politics in Ireland
Political parties established in 2019
Socialist Party (Ireland)
Trotskyist organisations in Ireland
Trotskyist organisations in Northern Ireland
Political parties in the Republic of Ireland